Edwin Núñez Martínez (born May 27, 1963) is a former pitcher for the Seattle Mariners (1982–88), New York Mets (1988), Detroit Tigers (1989–90), Milwaukee Brewers (1991–92), Texas Rangers (1992) and Oakland Athletics (1993–94).

He was the youngest player in the American League in 1982 and 1983.

In 13 seasons he had a 28–36 win–loss record, 427 games, 14 games started, 211 games finished, 54 saves,  innings pitched, 666 hits allowed, 345 runs allowed, 304 earned runs allowed, 74 home runs allowed, 280 walks allowed, 508 strikeouts, 19 hit batsmen, 23 wild pitches, 2,866 batters faced, 38 intentional walks, 10 balks, and a 4.19 ERA.

Pro career
In the spring of 1979, Núñez was signed by the Seattle Mariners as an undrafted amateur free agent and assigned to play for the Bellingham Mariners of the Northeast League. Playing on a team that included future MLB players Bud Black, Jim Presley, and former first round pick Al Chambers, Núñez posted a 4–1 record with a 2.08 ERA, and at the age of 16, was the youngest player on the roster. The next season, Núñez was promoted to the Wausau Timbers, at a higher level of single A ball. With Wausau, Núñez posted his best record as a pro, going 16–3, with 205 strikeouts, a 2.47 E.R.A and 13 complete games. 

In 1982, Núñez bypassed Double A completely and was promoted Núñez to Seattle's Triple A team, the Salt Lake City Gulls. Later that year Núñez made his Major League debut, a relief appearance in which he allowed four runs in three innings of work, while striking out one batter and walking two in a 7–5 loss to the Minnesota Twins. For the next few seasons, Núñez split time between Triple A and the Major Leagues as the Mariners attempted to convert Nunez from a starting pitcher into a reliever. In 1985, Núñez finished with a 7–3 record and 16 saves, the most saves he would ever record in a Major League season.

In 1988, Seattle traded Núñez to the New York Mets in exchange for pitcher Gene Walter. Núñez made just a handful of appearances for the Mets, as he would for the Detroit Tigers and Oakland A's. In May 1994, the A's released Núñez and he never pitched in the major leagues again.

The B.J. Surhoff incident
During an August 1993 double header between the A's and the Milwaukee Brewers, a bench-clearing brawl erupted in the second game. Núñez, who had been in the A's clubhouse, returned to the field and punched Brewers catcher B.J. Surhoff, leaving him with a bloody mouth that required stitches. Núñez said he was upset because Surhoff had shoved A's outfielder Scott Lydy. Núñez, who had pitched in the first game of the day, admitted he was wrong to have punched Surhoff.

See also
 List of Major League Baseball players from Puerto Rico
 Best pitching seasons by a Detroit Tiger

References

External links

1963 births
Living people
Bellingham Mariners players
Beloit Brewers players
Calgary Cannons players
Detroit Tigers players
Diablos Rojos del México players
Major League Baseball pitchers
Major League Baseball players from Puerto Rico
Mexican League baseball pitchers
Milwaukee Brewers players
New York Mets players
Oakland Athletics players
People from Humacao, Puerto Rico
Puerto Rican expatriate baseball players in Canada
Puerto Rican expatriate baseball players in Mexico
Salt Lake City Gulls players
Seattle Mariners players
Texas Rangers players
Toledo Mud Hens players
Wausau Timbers players